The Shahid Dr. Azodi Stadium is a multipurpose stadium in Rasht, Iran.  It is currently used mostly for football matches and is the home stadium of S.C. Damash Gilan, who play in the Persian Gulf Pro League. The stadium holds up to 15,000 people.

Name 
The stadium is named after Dr. Hassan Azodi who was killed on June 28, 1982, in an explosion at the central office of the Islamic Republican Party.

References 
 

Football venues in Iran
Multi-purpose stadiums in Iran
Buildings and structures in Gilan Province
Damash Gilan
Sport in Gilan Province